"Ain't Nobody" is an R&B/hip hop soul mid-tempo song produced by Dallas Austin for American R&B singer Monica. It was featured on the Nutty Professor official soundtrack, and also was released as Miss Thang's fourth and final single on a double A-side with "Why I Love You So Much" on May 20, 1996 (see 1996 in music). The double-A-side single became Monica's fourth top ten hit on the U.S. Billboard Hot 100 (Consecutive), reaching number 9 and number 3 on the Hot R&B/Hip-Hop Singles & Tracks chart.

Music video 
The music video for "Ain't Nobody" was directed by David Nelson (Known for his work for Donell Jones, Da Brat, 2Pac, R. Kelly & Nicole Wray) and was filmed in the Staten Island Ferry, in New York City. It also features scenes from the Nutty Professor movie, cut between Monica & Treach's scenes.

Formats and track listings
These are the formats and track listings of major single-releases of "Ain't Nobody"
 "Ain't Nobody" (Main Mix)
 "Ain't Nobody" (No Rap)
 "Ain't Nobody (Quiet Storm Mix)

Charts

Weekly charts

Year-end charts

Notes

External links
 Monica.com — official Monica site
 Monica music videos — watch "Ain't Nobody" at LAUNCHcast

1996 singles
Monica (singer) songs
Songs written by Dallas Austin
1996 songs
Def Jam Recordings singles
Song recordings produced by Dallas Austin
Songs written by Treach